Coroana may refer to:
 Austro-Hungarian krone, the official currency of the Austro-Hungarian Empire from 1892, localised as coroană in Romanian
 Hungarian korona, a former currency of Hungary, localised as coroană in Romanian
 Coroana, Romania, a village in the Albești, Constanța commune

See also
 Corona (disambiguation)
 Korona (disambiguation)